Lalu Bazar or Lalu-ye Bazar may refer to:
 Lalu Bazar, Chabahar (للو بازار - Lalū Bāzār)
 Lalu Bazar, Qasr-e Qand (لالوبازار - Lālū Bāzār)